Sir Patrick Ledger Goodman  (6 April 1929 – 9 September 2017), known as Pat Goodman or Sir Pat Goodman, was a prominent New Zealand businessman, arts patron and philanthropist. Along with his brother, Peter,  he co-founded the Australasian food giant Goodman Fielder. He was CEO and chairman of the company.

Goodman was made a Commander of the Order of the British Empire, for services to business management and the community, in the 1990 New Year Honours. In the 1995 Queen's Birthday Honours, he was appointed a Knight Bachelor, for services to business management, export and the community. In the 2002 Queen's Birthday and Golden Jubilee Honours, Goodman was appointed a Principal Companion of the New Zealand Order of Merit, for services to business, the arts and the community. In 2009, following the restoration of titular honours by the New Zealand government, he accepted redesignation as a Knight Grand Companion of the New Zealand Order of Merit.

In 2005, Goodman was inducted into the New Zealand Business Hall of Fame.

Goodman died at his home in Motueka on 9 September 2017.

References

1929 births
2017 deaths
New Zealand businesspeople
People educated at St. Patrick's College, Silverstream
People from Motueka
Knights Bachelor
Knights Grand Companion of the New Zealand Order of Merit
New Zealand Commanders of the Order of the British Empire
Businesspeople awarded knighthoods